Olga Aleksandrovna Brusnikina (born 9 November 1978) is a Russian competitor in synchronised swimming and three times Olympic champion.

She first attracted attention when, at the age of 14, she performed a solo routine at the 1993 World Junior Synchro championships. Upon the addition of team synchronised swimming to the list of Olympic events in 1996, Brusnikina was a member of the Russian team which came fourth. She won gold medal in duet with Mariya Kiselyova at the 2000 Summer Olympics in Sydney. She was part of the Russian winning team in 2000, and again at the 2004 Summer Olympics in Athens.

In September 2001, Brusnikina married Sergey Yevstigneyev, an Olympic water polo player and national coach whom she first met in 1994. After marriage, they lived for a few years in Italy, where Yevstigneyev played for a local team and Brusnikina coached synchronized swimming.

Brusnikina retired shortly after the 2004 Olympics, and on 14 August 2006 gave birth to a son, Iliya. After that she coached synchronized swimming in Moscow Oblast and worked as an international referee. Currently, she is a member of the Government Commission on Physical Education and Sport and of the Russian Olympic Committee. 

Since December 6, 2022, she has headed the Synchronized Swimming Federation of the Russian Federation.

Awards
In 2001, she was awarded the Order of Honour.

See also
 List of members of the International Swimming Hall of Fame

References

External links

1978 births
Living people
Russian synchronized swimmers
Olympic medalists in synchronized swimming
Olympic gold medalists for Russia
Olympic synchronized swimmers of Russia
Synchronized swimmers at the 1996 Summer Olympics
Synchronized swimmers at the 2000 Summer Olympics
Synchronized swimmers at the 2004 Summer Olympics
Medalists at the 2000 Summer Olympics
Medalists at the 2004 Summer Olympics
World Aquatics Championships medalists in synchronised swimming
Synchronized swimmers at the 1998 World Aquatics Championships
Synchronized swimmers at the 2001 World Aquatics Championships
Synchronized swimmers at the 2003 World Aquatics Championships
Swimmers from Moscow
Russian State University of Physical Education, Sport, Youth and Tourism alumni